Cry Freetown is a 2000 documentary film directed by Sorious Samura. It is an account of the victims of the Sierra Leone Civil War and depicts the most brutal period with the Revolutionary United Front (RUF) rebels capturing the capital city (January 1999). The film also documents the Nigerian army summarily executing suspects. It was broadcast on CNN International on February 3, 2000. The film was produced with the assistance of CNN Productions, the Dutch news program 2Vandaag and Insight News Television. Awards for the film include the Emmy Award, BAFTA Award, Peabody Award and the 2001 silver award at the Alfred I. duPont–Columbia University Awards.

References

External links
 Some of the persons interviewed by Sorious Samura in Cry Freetown (i.e. Father Giuseppe Berton and some baby soldiers) are the same interviewed, in 2012, ten years later, in the Documentary Life does not lose its value (Original title, Italian language, La vita non perde valore), by Wilma Massucco (ITA/ENG - 53' - Bluindaco Productions © 2012). Main focus of the Documentary: reintegration, led by Father Giuseppe Berton, of former child soldiers, ten years after the Sierra Leone Civil War that occurred between 1991 and 2002.
 
 Cry Freetown at Insight TWI (formerly Insight News TV)

2000 films
Films set in Sierra Leone
Documentary films about war
Sierra Leone Civil War
2000 documentary films
Peabody Award-winning broadcasts
Sierra Leonean documentary films